The 2010 Challenger DCNS de Cherbourg was a professional tennis tournament played on indoor hard courts. It was part of the 2010 ATP Challenger Tour. It took place in Cherbourg-Octeville, France between 1 and 7 March 2010.

ATP entrants

Seeds

Rankings are as of February 22.

Other entrants
The following players received wildcards into the singles main draw:
  Arnaud Clément
  Jonathan Eysseric
  Axel Michon
  Gilles Müller

The following players received entry from the qualifying draw:
 Romain Jouan
 Konstantin Kravchuk
 Alexander Kudryavtsev
 Fabrice Martin

Champions

Singles

 Nicolas Mahut def.  Gilles Müller, 6–4, 6–3

Doubles

 Nicolas Mahut /  Édouard Roger-Vasselin def.  Harsh Mankad /  Adil Shamasdin, 6–2, 6–4

External links
 

2010 in French tennis
March 2010 sports events in France
Challenger DCNS de Cherbourg
Challenger La Manche